RPI may refer to:

Universities
 Rensselaer Polytechnic Institute, Troy, New York, US
 Richmond Professional Institute, merged into Virginia Commonwealth University

Science and technology
 Raspberry Pi (RPi), a UK single-board computer
 Reticulocyte production index, a blood test result
 Ribose-5-phosphate isomerase (Rpi), an enzyme

Organizations
 Recognition Professionals International
 Republican Party of India
 Republican Party of Iowa

Other
 Rating Percentage Index, in college sports
 Retail price index, UK inflation measure
 Revenue Protection Inspector, on UK public transport
 Rock progressivo italiano, Italian progressive rock

See also
 RP 1 (disambiguation)
 RPL (disambiguation)